In Need of Medical Attention is the debut solo album by Joel Plaskett, released in 1999 concurrently with Thrush Hermit's Clayton Park.

Track listing

1999 debut albums
Joel Plaskett albums